Dirk Langerbein (born 9 September 1971, in Lippetal) is a German former professional  footballer who played as goalkeeper.

During his career, he mostly played in the 2. Bundesliga, in which he made a total of 156 appearances playing for FC Gütersloh, LR Ahlen, MSV Duisburg and Rot Weiss Ahlen. In the 2004–05 season, he also made three Bundesliga appearances with 1. FC Nürnberg. He finished his career with Rot Weiss Ahlen in 2009, after which he started working as the club's goalkeeping coach.

References

1971 births
Living people
German footballers
Association football goalkeepers
SV Lippstadt 08 players
Rot Weiss Ahlen players
MSV Duisburg players
1. FC Nürnberg players
Rot-Weiss Essen players
FC Gütersloh 2000 players
Bundesliga players
2. Bundesliga players